McColm is both a surname and a given name. Notable people with the name include:

Malcolm McColm (1914–1966), Australian politician
Matt McColm (born 1965), American actor, stuntman, and model
McColm Cephas (born 1978), Liberian footballer